Warburton Hospital was a private Adventist hospital in Warburton, Victoria in Australia. The hospital was owned by the Trans Australian Union Conference of the Seventh day Adventist Church.

The hospital had a net loss of $2.25 million (including depreciation) over the previous five years. It was placed on the market in January 1998.

See also 

List of Seventh-day Adventist hospitals

References

External links
 Warburton Hospital Finally Sold 
The Warburton Dream
Hospital Sale
Adventist Directory

Hospital buildings completed in 1910
Hospitals affiliated with the Seventh-day Adventist Church
Hospitals in Victoria (Australia)
Hospitals established in 1910
Former Seventh-day Adventist institutions
Buildings and structures in the Shire of Yarra Ranges